The Malay Technology Museum is a museum in Kota Batu, a historical area in Bandar Seri Begawan, Brunei. It was opened in 1988 and contains exhibits on the traditional technologies used by the indigenous people of Brunei.

Location 
The museum is located in Kota Batu, a historical area in the capital which is home to the Kota Batu archaeological site, and the mausoleums of Sultan Sharif Ali and Sultan Bolkiah, the 3rd and 5th Sultans of Brunei respectively. It is also located near the Brunei Museum and the Brunei Darussalam Maritime Museum.

History 
The building was donated by the Royal Dutch Shell in conjunction with Brunei's independence in 1984. It was inaugurated by Sultan Hassanal Bolkiah on 29 February 1988.

Galleries 
The museum has three galleries:
 Water Village Traditional House Gallery — depicts the traditional architecture of houses in Kampong Ayer
 Water Village Traditional Technology Gallery — depicts the traditional industries in Kampong Ayer such as boat construction, roof-making, gold smithing, silver smithing, brass casting and cloth weaving.
 Inland Traditional Technology Gallery — depicts the traditional technologies used by the 'inland' people, in particular by the ethnic groups of Kedayan, Dusun and Murut.

See also
 List of museums in Brunei

References

External links 
 
  Malay Technology Museum in the Museums Department website

Museums in Brunei